The Vermilion Lakes are a series of lakes located immediately west of Banff, Alberta, in the Canadian Rocky Mountains.

The three lakes are formed in the Bow River valley, in the Banff National Park, at the foot of Mount Norquay. They are located between the Trans-Canada Highway and the Canadian Pacific Railway tracks. A hot spring is found at the third lake.

History
Archeological evidence proves human activity around the lakes dating back 10,800 years. The site was excavated by Parks Canada's Daryl Fedje, and found remains of campsites and obsidian tools.

Activities
Activities on and around the lakes include canoeing, kayaking, standup paddleboarding, wildlife watching, birdwatching, and hiking. The shorelines along Vermilion Lakes Drive are popular locations for sunrise and sunset photography.

Image gallery

References

External links
Virtual tour at Banff.com

Banff National Park
Bow River
Vermilion